Patryk Klimala (born 5 August 1998) is a Polish professional footballer who plays as a forward for Israeli Premier League club Hapoel Be'er Sheva

Club career

Early career
Born in Świdnica, Klimala began his career in Żarów about twelve kilometers north of Świdnica. He played for the club until 2012 when he went on to Lechia Dzierżoniów. From here, Klimala moved to Legia Warsaw's youth boarding school in 2014. Legia loaned the attacker back to his previous club Dzierżoniów from 2015 to 2016. While with Dzierżoniów he played in the III liga appearing in seven matches and scoring one goal.

Jagiellonia Białystok
Jagiellonia Białystok signed Klimala in July 2016. There he played for the U19 team for the first few months. Klimala made his first team debut for Jagiellonia on 25 September 2016 being subbed in for Przemysław Frankowski in the 92nd minute against Korona Kielce. He played two more games that season against Lech Poznań and Arka Gdynia being subbed in late in the game in both matches.

Loan to Wigry Suwałki
Klimala was loaned to I liga side Wigry Suwałki for the 2017/18 season. He scored his first goal for the club on 21 October 2017 in a 2–2 draw with Bytovia Bytów. He ended the season as the teams top scorer with 13 goals in 27 games.

Return to Jagiellonia
Following his season on loan, Klimala returned to Jagiellonia. He made his debut in the Europa League against Rio Ave on 26 July 2018 in a 1–0 victory, he was subbed in the 83rd minute.
Klimala got his first chance in the starting eleven against Piast Gliwice on 19 August 2018. He played 63 minutes before being subbed out for Karol Swiderski, with Jagiellonia winning 2–1.

On 4 December 2018, Klimala scored his first goal with Jagiellonia in a 2–0 victory over Arka Gdynia in the Polish Cup. On 12 March 2019, Klimala scored two goals in a 2–0 victory over Odra Opole, helping Jagiellonia advance to the semi-finals of the Polish Cup.
Klimala scored his first goal in the top flight Ekstraklasa on 6 April 2019 in a 2–1 victory over Zagłębie Sosnowiec.

Celtic
On 14 January 2020, Klimala signed a four-and-a-half-year deal with Celtic. The transfer fee was reported as four million euros. He scored the first goal of his Celtic career on July 16, 2020, in a pre-season friendly 1–1 draw against Nice in Lyon, France. He scored his first competitive goal for Celtic in a 5–1 win over Hamilton Academical on 2 August 2020.

New York Red Bulls
On 22 April 2021, Klimala signed a four-year contract with MLS side New York Red Bulls as a young designated player. On 23 June 2021, Klimala scored his first goal for New York in a 3-2 loss to New England Revolution. Klimala ended his first season with New York appearing in 30 matches and leading the team in scoring with 8 goals and 7 assists.

On 26 February 2022, Klimala scored New York's first goal of the season in a 3-1 victory over San Jose Earthquakes in the opening match of the season. On 5 March 2022, Klimala assisted on three Lewis Morgan first half goals to help New York to a 4-1 victory over Toronto FC. On 30 April 2022, Klimala scored two second half goals to help New York to a 2-1 victory over Chicago Fire SC.  On 18 May 2022 Klimala scored in injury time to help New York a to 3-3 draw with Chicago Fire SC.  On May 25, 2022, Klimale scored a goal and assisted another in a 3-1 victory for New York over Charlotte FC as his team advanced to the quarterfinals of the 2022 U.S. Open Cup.

Hapoel Be'er Sheva 
On 29 January 2023, Klimala moved to Israeli side Hapoel Be'er Sheva on a three-and-a-half-year deal.

International career
Klimala has represented Poland at under-19 youth international level and made his international debut against Slovakia U19 in November 2016. He made his under-20 debut against England U20 in March 2018, scoring his first international goal against the same opponents exactly one year later. In March 2019, Klimala made his under-21 debut against Serbia U21.

Career statistics

Club

Honours
Celtic 
Scottish Cup: 2019–20

References

External links

1998 births
Living people
People from Świdnica
Association football forwards
Polish footballers
Poland youth international footballers
Poland under-21 international footballers
Legia Warsaw players
Jagiellonia Białystok players
Wigry Suwałki players
Celtic F.C. players
New York Red Bulls players
Hapoel Be'er Sheva F.C. players
III liga players
I liga players
Ekstraklasa players
Scottish Professional Football League players
Major League Soccer players

Designated Players (MLS)
Polish expatriate footballers
Expatriate footballers in Scotland
Expatriate soccer players in the United States
Expatriate footballers in Israel
Polish expatriate sportspeople in Scotland
Polish expatriate sportspeople in the United States
Polish expatriate sportspeople in Israel